Michael or Mike Foster may refer to:

Entertainment
 Michael Foster (American writer) (1904–1956), novelist, journalist, and  cartoonist
 Michael Foster (Australian writer) (born 1973), writer of science fiction and fantasy
 Michael Foster (agent) (born 1958), British former talent agent and political candidate
 Michael Foster (musician) (born 1964), American drummer of the rock band FireHouse
 M. A. Foster (Michael Anthony Foster, 1939–2020), American author/writer

Politics 
 Mike Foster (American politician) (1930–2020), American politician
 Michael Foster (Hastings and Rye MP) (born 1946), British politician
 Mike Foster (Worcester MP) (born 1963), British politician
 Mike Foster (Canadian politician), of Toronto, Ontario

Sports 
 Michael Foster (cricketer, born 1972), English cricketer
 Michael Foster (cricketer, born 1973), Australian cricketer
 Michael Foster (cricketer, born 1979), former English cricketer
 Mike Foster (footballer) (born 1939), English footballer
 Michael Foster (footballer) (born 1985), Papua New Guinean midfielder
 Michael G. Foster (1940–2021), founder of Yoshukai International karate
 Michael Foster (basketball) (born 2003), American basketball player

Other people 
 Michael Foster (English judge) (1689–1763), English judge
 Michael Foster (physiologist) (1836–1907), British physiologist and Member of Parliament (MP)
 Michael Foster (philosopher) (1903–1959), tutor in philosophy at Oxford University
 Michael John Foster (scoutmaster) (born 1952), British Scout leader and Anglican priest
 Michael Foster (academic), American folklore professor
 Mike Foster, American activist, co-founder of XXXchurch.com

See also
 Michael Forster (disambiguation)
 Michael John Foster (disambiguation)